Agrarian parties of Finland were and their successors are a typical part of the development in the Nordic countries, which has been based on milk production in distant and relatively sparsely populated areas. The state support for small peasants was one of the essential economic reforms in the newly independent Finland just after the declaration of independence in 1917 and fierce civil war of 1918. Already in 1917 the land reform, which had been discussed for more than ten years seriously in the parliament was executed. The tendency toward increasing small farming continued in various other reforms like Lex Kallio, which made it possible for the small peasants to achieve more lands. This made parliamentary life fragile in Finland as the reforms created mistrust between the Agrarian League lea mainly by Kyösti Kallio and the National Coalition party (National Coalition since 1951), which favoured bigger land-owners. Between the world wars strong agrarian movements were not only in the Nordic countries, but also in Bulgaria.

Historically farmers' party, a declining farmer population after the Second World War made them broaden their scope to other issues and sections of society. At this time, they renamed themselves, three of them to Centre Party, with the Finnish Centre Party being the last to do so, in 1965.  Now, the main agrarian parties are the Centre Party in Sweden, Venstre in Denmark, Centre Party in Finland, Centre Party in Norway and Progressive Party in Iceland. A similar strain of parties has emerged in the Baltic countries.

Only in Finland there are two strong Agrarian party successors left based on Agrarian League (Finland), the Centre Party of Finland and the split of Agrarian League (Finland), the True Finns.

History
Compared to continental Europe, the peasants in the Nordic countries historically had an unparalleled degree of political influence, being not only independent but also represented as the fourth estate in the national diets, like in the Swedish Riksdag of the Estates.  The agrarian movement thus precedes the labour movement by centuries in Sweden, Denmark, Finland and Norway.

The first of the parties, Venstre in Denmark, was formed as a liberal, anti-tax farmers' party in 1870.  The rest of the parties emerged in the early 20th century, spurred by the introduction of universal suffrage and proportional representation across the region.  Finland's Centre Party was the first to be created in 1906, followed by the Centre Party in Norway in 1915. Sweden's Centre Party, founded in 1921, emerged from the existing Lantmanna Party, and its splinter groups.

Ideology

In the 1930s spontaneous Agradian movements were based on the critique against the cabinets, where also the Agrarian League was presented. In the 1930s there were after Kyösti Kallio's third cabinet, Pehr Evind Svinhufvud's second cabinet and Juho Sunila's second cabinet, which were majority cabinets,  Kivimäki's minority cabinet, which was based on the small National Progressive Party backed by it, Swedish People's Party and  Agrarian League. There were also non-partisan ministers. The Agrarians thought that Agrarian League does not do enough for the country side during the economic recession.

The second split happened in the late 1950s as Finland started to industrialise strongly setting the national target, the Swedish model. A member of the Agrarian league, Veikko Vennamo, established the Small Peasants' Party of Finland in 1959, which got three substantial victories in 1970, also in 1972 and 1983. After 1970 elections, the chairman of the Centre Party (Agrarian League 1908-1965) Johannes Virolainen declared, that the Center Party has to come back to aitovierille (the country field fence sides) and thus take seriously the agricultural matters and country side. This led to the hardened national agricultural policies and regional policies which made escape from the country side to cities and Sweden to work slower. The Centre Party succeeded in 1972 destroying the strong mandate of The Rural Party of Finland by promoting the possibility to take the party state subsidies to a new party, the |Party of the Unity of the Finnish People.

As had changed its name in 1965, from Agrarian League to the Center Party under Johannes Virolainen's chairmanship, the Small Peasants' Party of Finland changed its name the next year to The Rural Party of Finland as if it had taken the place in the politics from Agrarian League to defend agriculture and the countryside. The organisations of The Rural Party of Finland bankrupted. In 1995 the members of The Rural Party of Finland established the True Finns. The main argument has been to promote confederalist thinking and preserving the national state as a vehicle to fulfill national democracy, which has led into the eurosceptical thinking as far as it concerns the EMU bailouts.

References

Sources
 
 
 
 
 
 

Nordic agrarian parties
Political parties in Finland by ideology